The former ETA Foods Factory is a heritage-listed building as an important Modernist industrial building in Victoria, Australia, notable for its glass curtain wall design. The building was constructed in 1957 in Braybrook, a suburb of Melbourne, on Ballarat Road.

Designer
The ETA factory was designed by Frederick Romberg of Grounds Romberg and Boyd for the original owner Nut Foods. The curtain wall of the administration building presented the public façade, and it became one of the most distinguished industrial buildings during the post-war period. It is notable for the elegance of the handling of the Miesian curtain wall fronting Ballarat Road with alternating bands of clear and black glass, exposed tubular steel diagonal members picked out in gold matte paint and classical colonnade implied in the regular rhythm of structural columns. The factory is now derelict, but still considered one of the best post-war factories built in Victoria. The building forms a façade to the more utilitarian sawtooth roof factory behind but is detached from it, separated by a landscaped courtyard garden but linked by a continuous cantilevered loading bay canopy which forms the fourth side of the courtyard.

The glass and aluminium construction continues around the sides and back giving the building a stand-alone integrity unusual for factory offices. A cantilevered, "floating" staircase enclosed by the glass wall forms the prominent entrance feature. A service tower stands above the roof line as a projecting geometric form originally carrying the ETA brand name.

Landscape and sculpture
Integral to the design was an internal landscaped garden courtyard with a rock pool and fountain designed by John Stevens. A sculpture commissioned by the company from Teisutis (Joe) Zikaras consists of two cast concrete sections of similar curving forms, placed one above the other in a delicate sense of balance on a basalt boulder at the base, and set in a circular concrete basin filled with water and edged with basalt boulders. Four copper discs on opposite sides were meant to direct water onto the sculpture but are not in working order. Remnants of the original integrated landscape design can be seen, including cactus and cordyline in the courtyard. Angular and zig-zag paths and pebble borders are only evident in fragments.

Architectural importance
The ETA factory is important for its featurist conception of the facade as billboard. The long curtain wall of the administration block facing Ballarat Road, with its brooding black vitrolite panels, is given added dynamism by the arrow-like diagonal bracing (originally finished in gold) that were used to lead the eye to supergraphic signage. The carpark / entry canopy is daringly wide, supported by an innovative cable structure tied back into the building and the ground of the courtyard. Other structural innovations include the tubular steel roof trusses designed by Engineer John Connell.

The ETA factory had some international prominence. It was the only Australian design included in the 1962 publication Industriebau, a seminal international text on industrial design, published by the German Academy's Institute for Industrial Construction.

In the 1960s, the factory produced a unique Christmas illumination with a diorama of north pole scenery above the cantilevered veranda facing the side street, and Father Christmas appearing on his sled.

Conservation
While it is listed on the Victorian Heritage Register the building has been allowed to fall into disrepair and been vandalised, including the removal of all the glass panes in about 2008.  The site had been bought by car dealer Binks Ford in the late-1990s and intended to convert it into a showroom, but put the property on the market in 2008. The site was then sold to a property developer in 2011, who was required to restore a remnant of the original buildings.

References

Manufacturing plants in Melbourne
Heritage-listed buildings in Melbourne
Buildings and structures in the City of Maribyrnong
1957 establishments in Australia
Modernist architecture in Australia
Industrial buildings completed in 1957